Joel Álvarez González  (born March 2, 1993) is a Spanish mixed martial artist who competes in the Lightweight division of the Ultimate Fighting Championship.

Background

Joel was born in Gijón, Spain and spent his childhood in the neighborhood of the Pumarín industrial park. When he was 18 years old he began to practice mixed martial arts at a gym in his city, the Tibet Sports Center, and years later he made his debut in several tournaments at regional level.

Mixed martial arts career

Early career
A professional competitor since 2013, Álvarez fought primarily in his native Spain and garnered a record of 15 wins against 1 loss in the first five years of his career. He was undefeated in the Spanish promotion Ansgar Fighting League (AFL), where he was the Lightweight Champion, after defeating Brazil's Julio César Alves by submission in the second round.

Ultimate Fighting Championship
In his debut, Álvarez faced Damir Ismagulov on February 23, 2019 at UFC Fight Night: Błachowicz vs. Santos. He lost the fight via unanimous decision.

Álvarez faced Danilo Belluardo on June 1, 2019 at UFC Fight Night: Gustafsson vs. Smith. He won the fight via TKO in the second round.

Álvarez faced Joseph Duffy on July 15, 2020 at UFC Fight Night 172. He won the fight via a submission in round one.

Álvarez faced Alexander Yakovlev on October 24, 2020 at UFC 254. At the weigh-ins, Álvarez weighed in at 159.5 pounds, three and a half pounds over the lightweight non-title fight limit. The bout proceeded at catchweight and he was fined 30% of his purse, which went to his opponent Yakovlev. He won the fight via an armbar submission in round one.

Álvarez was scheduled to face Christos Giagos  on May 15, 2021 at UFC 262. However, Álvarez was removed from the bout in early May due to alleged visa issues that restricted his travel, and was replaced by Sean Soriano.

Álvarez faced Thiago Moisés on November 13, 2021 at UFC Fight Night 197.  At the weigh-ins, Álvarez  weighed in at 157.5 pounds, one and a half pounds over the lightweight non-title fight limit. The bout proceeded at a catchweight with Álvarez fined 30% of his purse, which went to Moisés. Álvarez won the fight via technical knockout in round one.

Álvarez faced Arman Tsarukyan on February 26, 2022 at UFC Fight Night 202. He lost the bout via ground and pound TKO in the second round.

Álvarez was scheduled to face Zubaira Tukhugov on February 14, 2023 at UFC 284.  However, Alvarez withrew from the event for undisclosed reasons and he was replace by promotional newcomer Elves Brenner.

Mixed martial arts record

|-
|Loss
|align=center|19–3
|Arman Tsarukyan 
|TKO (punches)
|UFC Fight Night: Makhachev vs. Green
|
|align=center|2
|align=center|1:57
|Las Vegas, Nevada, United States
|
|-
|Win
|align=center|19–2
|Thiago Moisés
|TKO (elbows and punches)
|UFC Fight Night: Holloway vs. Rodríguez
|
|align=center|1
|align=center|3:01
|Las Vegas, Nevada, United States
|
|-
|Win
|align=center|18–2
|Alexander Yakovlev
|Submission (armbar)
|UFC 254
|
|align=center|1
|align=center|3:00
|Abu Dhabi, United Arab Emirates
|
|-
|Win
|align=center|17–2
|Joseph Duffy
|Submission (guillotine choke)
|UFC Fight Night: Figueiredo vs. Benavidez 2 
|
|align=center|1
|align=center|2:25
|Abu Dhabi, United Arab Emirates
|
|-
|Win
|align=center|16–2
|Danilo Belluardo
|TKO (punches)
|UFC Fight Night: Gustafsson vs. Smith 
|
|align=center|2
|align=center|2:22
|Stockholm, Sweden
|
|-
|Loss
|align=center|15–2
|Damir Ismagulov
|Decision (unanimous)
|UFC Fight Night: Błachowicz vs. Santos
|
|align=center|3
|align=center|5:00
|Prague, Czech Republic
|
|-
|Win
|align=center|15–1
|Radu Maxim
|Submission (triangle choke)
|AFL 17: Coal and Blood
|
|align=center|1
|align=center|4:29
|Langreo, Spain
|
|-
| Win
| align=center| 14–1
| Julio Cesar Alves
|Submission (brabo choke)
| AFL 16: Feudal War
| 
| align=center| 2
| align=center| 1:02
| Valladolid, Spain
| 
|-
| Win
| align=center| 13–1
| Alexandre Ribeiro
|Submission (triangle choke)
| AFL 15: Typhoon
| 
| align=center| 1
| align=center| 4:17
| San Sebastián, Spain
|
|-
| Win
| align=center| 12–1
| Kevin Daniel Delgado
| Submission (guillotine choke)
| AFL 14: Outbreak
| 
| align=center| 1
| align=center| 0:26
| Las Palmas, Spain
|
|-
| Win
| align=center| 11–1
| Francisco Gonzalez
| Submission (guillotine choke)
| AFL 13
| 
| align=center| 1
| align=center| 1:59
| Gijón, Spain
|
|-
| Win
| align=center| 10–1
| Jekson Poleza
| Submission (triangle choke)
| AFL 12: Warcelona
| 
| align=center| 1
| align=center| 1:57
| Barcelona, Spain
| 
|-
| Win
| align=center| 9–1
| Anthony Muller
| TKO
| Fight Night Series 2
| 
| align=center| 1
| align=center| 0:33
| Montreux, Switzerland
| 
|-
| Win
| align=center| 8–1
| Moncef Ed Doukani
| Submission (anaconda choke)
| MMA Casino Fights: Álvarez vs. Ed Doukani
| 
| align=center| 1
| align=center| 1:45
| Gijón, Spain
|
|-
| Win
| align=center| 7–1
| Jose Luis Bravo
| Submission (triangle choke)
| MMA Casino Fights: Álvarez vs. Bravo
| 
| align=center| 1
| align=center| 0:49
| Gijón, Spain
| 
|-
| Win
| align=center| 6–1
| Carlos Villar
| Submission (armbar)
| MMA España: Bandog Challenge 3
| 
| align=center| 1
| align=center| 4:20
| Gijón, Spain
| 
|-
| Loss
| align=center| 5–1
| Ali Abdulkhalikov
| KO (spinning heel kick)
| M-1 Challenge 56
| 
| align=center| 1
| align=center| 0:34
| Moscow, Russia
| 
|-
| Win
| align=center| 5–0
| Graham Turner
| Submission (guillotine choke)
| Rage in the Cage 3
| 
| align=center| 3
| align=center| N/A
| Paisley, Scotland
| 
|-
| Win
| align=center| 4–0
| Jose Luis Bravo
| Submission (triangle choke)
| MMA España: Desafio Burgos Profight 2015
| 
| align=center| 1
| align=center| 3:20
| Burgos, Spain
| 
|-
| Win
| align=center| 3–0
| Helson Henriques
| Submission (anaconda choke)
| International Pro Combat 6
| 
| align=center| 1
| align=center| 1:23
| Lisbon, Portugal
| 
|-
| Win
| align=center| 2–0
| Hicham Rachid
| Submission (triangle choke)
| MMA España: Bandog Challenge 2
| 
| align=center| 1
| align=center| 2:01
| Gijón, Spain
| 
|-
| Win
| align=center| 1–0
| Aratz Garmendia
| Submission (triangle choke)
| Txurdinaga Sutan: Pro Boxing & MMA
| 
| align=center| 1
| align=center| 3:19
| Bilbao, Spain
| 
|-

See also 
 List of current UFC fighters
 List of male mixed martial artists

References

External links
  
 

Living people
1993 births
Spanish male mixed martial artists
Lightweight mixed martial artists
Mixed martial artists utilizing Brazilian jiu-jitsu
Ultimate Fighting Championship male fighters
Spanish practitioners of Brazilian jiu-jitsu
Sportspeople from Gijón